In mathematics, a Delzant polytope is a convex polytope in  such for each vertex , exactly  edges meet at , and these edges form a collection of vectors that form a -basis of .

The theorem states that there is a bijective correspondence between symplectic toric manifolds (up to torus-equivariant symplectomorphism) and Delzant polytopes -- more precisely, the moment polytope of a symplectic toric manifold is a Delzant polytope, every Delzant polytope is the moment polytope of such a manifold, and any two such manifolds with the equivalent moment polytopes (up to translations) admit a torus-equivariant symplectomorphism between them.

References

Symplectic geometry
Theorems in differential geometry